Etienne Arthur Boka (born 2 April 1983) is an Ivorian former professional footballer who played as a left back for the Ivory Coast national team. At club level, he plays for Atlético de Marbella in the seventh-tier Primera Andaluza.

He was a part of the Ivory Coast squads at two FIFA World Cups and five Africa Cups of Nations between 2006 and 2013. Boka is known for his lightning pace even though he is a man of a very small build.

Club career
Like many successful players from Ivory Coast, he started his career at homeland club ASEC Abidjan, after coming through their much famed youth system, that has also produced players such as Kolo Touré, Emmanuel Eboué, and Aruna Dindane. He joined the club after walking in from the streets of Ivory Coast capital Abidjan and asking for a trial. Following his graduation from the academy he moved on to Belgian club K.S.K. Beveren in 2002, where impressive performances earned him a transfer to the then Ligue 1 club RC Strasbourg in France for the 2004–05 season. He impressed further at Strasbourg, but following their relegation at the end of the 2005–06 season he left to join German top-flight club VfB Stuttgart. His impressive attack minded play from his left-back position have earned him the nickname of "The African Roberto Carlos". In the 2006–07 season Boka won the Bundesliga title with VfB Stuttgart.

On 14 January 2009 he extended his contract at VfB Stuttgart until the summer of 2012. On 30 May 2012, Boka signed a new one-year contract with an option for a further year at VfB Stuttgart. Boka used to be playing as left back, but in the middle of 2012–13 Bundesliga season he began playing as defensive midfielder. On 1 May 2014, Boka agreed a transfer to Spanish La Liga side Málaga CF, signing a two-year deal with the Andalusians. He made his debut in the competition on 29 August, starting in a 0–3 away loss against Valencia CF. He joined Swiss team FC Sion in July 2016 but left in February 2017 after just three Super League appearances.

International career
Boka has 72 caps for the Ivory Coast, scored one goal, and was called up to the 2006 World Cup, where he played all three group games for the Elephants, where he performed impressively, gaining one assist. He was also called up to the 2010 World Cup, where he played the final group match against North Korea gaining two assists.

He represented Ivory Coast in the 2006 Africa Cup of Nations and was also part of the Ivorian squad at the 2008 Africa Cup of Nations in Ghana. Boka was also called up for the 2010 Africa Cup of Nations, the 2012 Africa Cup of Nations and the 2013 Africa Cup of Nations. With Ivory Coast, Boka reached the finals of the Africa Cup of Nations in 2006 and 2012, but they were beaten on penalties on both occasions.

Career statistics

International goals

Honours

Club
Beveren
 Belgian Cup runner-up: 2003–04

Strasbourg
 Coupe de la Ligue: 2004–05

VfB Stuttgart
 Bundesliga winner: 2006–07
 DFB-Pokal runner-up: 2006–07, 2012–13

International
Ivory Coast
 Africa Cup of Nations runner-up: 2006, 2010

References

External links
 
 
 
 
 
 

1983 births
Living people
Footballers from Abidjan
Ivorian footballers
Association football defenders
ASEC Mimosas players
K.S.K. Beveren players
Belgian Pro League players
RC Strasbourg Alsace players
Ligue 1 players
VfB Stuttgart players
Bundesliga players
Málaga CF players
La Liga players
FC Sion players
Swiss Super League players
Ivorian expatriate sportspeople in Belgium
Ivorian expatriate footballers
Expatriate footballers in Belgium
Expatriate footballers in France
Expatriate footballers in Germany
Ivorian expatriate sportspeople in Germany
Expatriate footballers in Spain
Ivorian expatriate sportspeople in Spain
Ivorian expatriate sportspeople in Switzerland
Expatriate footballers in Switzerland
Ivory Coast international footballers
2006 FIFA World Cup players
2010 FIFA World Cup players
2014 FIFA World Cup players
2006 Africa Cup of Nations players
2008 Africa Cup of Nations players
2010 Africa Cup of Nations players
2012 Africa Cup of Nations players
2013 Africa Cup of Nations players